Josh Teskey (born 31 July 1987) is an Australian blues musician, best known for his work with the Teskey Brothers. Teskey released the collaborative studio album, Push the Blues Away with Ash Grunwald, on 13 November 2020, which peaked at number 8 on the ARIA Albums Chart.

Life and career

1987–2007: Early life
Josh Teskey was born on 31 July 1987 in Warrandyte, Victoria. He attended a local primary school with no year levels. He was close to his brother Sam, with Josh saying in 2021, "We had these bird calls we'd do so we could always find each other in bush near where we lived. We also used them at parties when we were teenagers. I'd do the call and Sam would materialise out of the crowd." The two started playing music together after moving to a Steiner high school when Josh was 15 and Sam 13. Josh said "I jumped straight into singing and then played guitar, but Sam focused on the guitar".

2008–present: The Teskey Brothers

In 2008, Josh and Sam formed the blues rock band, the Teskey Brothers alongside Brendon Love and Liam Gough. The band became a fixture at the St Andrews Market, performing at regular spots in Warrandyte and bars in Melbourne, as well as other private shows. The band released their debut studio album, Half Mile Harvest in 2017 which peaked at number 18 on the ARIA Charts. The band's second studio album, Run Home Slow was released in 2019 and peaked at number 2 on the ARIA Charts and won three ARIA Music Awards at the 2019 awards.

2019–present: Solo career & Push the Blues Away

On 18 October 2019, Teskey featured on the Soul Messin' Allstars song "Soul a Go Go".

On 23 August 2020, Teskey and Ash Grunwald premiered the song "Thinking 'Bout Myself" on ABC's The Sound. The song is the lead single from their collaborative studio album, Push the Blues Away, released on 13 November 2020. Push the Blues Away debuted and peaked at number 8 on the ARIA Charts.

Discography

Collaborative albums

Singles

Guest appearances

Awards and nominations

AIR Awards
The Australian Independent Record Awards (commonly known informally as AIR Awards) is an annual awards night to recognise, promote and celebrate the success of Australia's independent music sector.

! 
|-
! scope="row"| 2021
| Push the Blues Away 
| Best Independent Blues and Roots Album or EP
| 
| 
|}

APRA Awards
The APRA Awards are held in Australia and New Zealand by the Australasian Performing Right Association to recognise songwriting skills, sales and airplay performance by its members annually. Josh Teskey has been nominated for three awards.

! 
|-
| 2019 
| "Forever You and Me" 
| Song of the Year
| 
| 
|-
! scope="row" rowspan="3"| 2020
| rowspan="2"| "I Get Up" 
| Song of the Year
| 
| rowspan="3"| 
|-
| Most Performed Blues & Roots Work of the Year
| 
|-
| The Teskey Brothers 
| Breakthrough Songwriter of the Year 
| 
|-
| 2021
| "Rain" 
| Most Performed R&B / Soul Work
| 
| 
|-
| 2022
| "Hungry Heart" 
| Most Performed Blues and Roots Work
| 
| 
|}

ARIA Music Awards
The ARIA Music Awards is an annual ceremony presented by Australian Recording Industry Association (ARIA), which recognise excellence, innovation, and achievement across all genres of the music of Australia. They commenced in 1987.

! 
|-
| scope="row"| 2021|| Push the Blues Away (with Ash Grunwald ) || ARIA Award for Best Blues and Roots Album || 
|

Music Victoria Awards
The Music Victoria Awards, are an annual awards night celebrating Victorian music. They commenced in 2005.

! 
|-
| 2021
| Josh Teskey and Ash Grunwald
| Best Blues Act
| 
|
|-

References

1987 births
APRA Award winners
Australian blues guitarists
Australian blues singers
Australian male singers
Australian male singer-songwriters
Living people
The Teskey Brothers members
People from Warrandyte, Victoria
21st-century Australian musicians
Musicians from Melbourne